Cynthia Hill may refer to:

Cindy Hill, American golfer
Cynthia Hill (director), American director and producer